In the 1935 season of the Campeonato Carioca, two championships were disputed, each by a different league.

FMD Championship

At the end of 1934, Vasco da Gama had a falling out with LCF, along with São Cristóvão and Bangu, and after talks with Botafogo, formed a new league; FMD (Federação Metropolitana de Desportos, or Metropolitan Sports Federation), comprising the three former LCF members and many of the members of AMEA, which ceased to exist as a result.

The edition of the Campeonato Carioca organized by FMD kicked off on May 12, 1935 and ended on January 26, 1936. Nine teams participated. However, SC Brasil, under financial trouble, withdrew after losing its first five matches, and on the last rounds of the championship, Carioca, after abandoning the pitch twice, was fined two contos de réis and abandoned the league after that as well. As a consequence, Carioca would be barred from disputing the FMD championship in the next year and would only return in 1937. Botafogo won the championship for the 8th time. no teams were relegated.

System
The tournament would be disputed in a triple round-robin format, with the team with the most points winning the title.

Championship

LCF Championship

The edition of the Campeonato Carioca organized by LCF (Liga Carioca de Football, or Carioca Football League) kicked off on July 21, 1935 and ended on November 10, 1935. Although LCF had lost half of its members, after AMEA's closure, Portuguesa joined LCF, bringing its membership to five teams. The championship now would be among league members and the winner of the previous year's Subliga Carioca de Football, Modesto, as a guest. América won the championship for the 6th time. no teams were relegated.

System
The tournament would be disputed in a triple round-robin format, with the team with the most points winning the title.

Championship

References

Campeonato Carioca seasons
Carioca